"The Wanderer" is a song written by Ernie Maresca and originally recorded by Dion, released on his 1961 album Runaround Sue.  The song, with a 12-bar blues-base verse and an eight-bar bridge, tells the story of a travelling man and his many loves.  The song is ranked number 243 on the Rolling Stone magazine's list of The 500 Greatest Songs of All Time.

History
Maresca had co-written Dion's previous number-one hit, "Runaround Sue", but originally intended "The Wanderer" to be recorded by another group, Nino and the Ebb Tides.  They passed on it in favor of another Maresca song, so Dion was given it as the B-side of his follow-up single, "The Majestic", a song which his record company had chosen for him.  The record was turned over by radio DJs who preferred "The Wanderer", which duly entered the US charts in December 1961 and rose to number 2 in early 1962 (behind "Duke of Earl" by Gene Chandler). It also reached number 10 in the UK and number one in Australia.

The song was recorded with an uncredited background vocal group, the Del-Satins, in a rockier style than Dion's earlier hits with the Belmonts.  The Del-Satins were an established doo-wop group led by Stan Ziska (later known as Stan Sommers), who at the time were also contracted to Laurie Records, and who later formed the core of Johnny Maestro & the Brooklyn Bridge. Musicians on the original recording included Bucky Pizzarelli and Johnny Falbo on guitars, Jerome Richardson on alto sax, Buddy Lucas on tenor sax, Milt Hinton on bass, and Panama Francis on drums.

Dion said of "The Wanderer":
At its roots, it's more than meets the eye. "The Wanderer" is black music filtered through an Italian neighborhood that comes out with an attitude. It's my perception of a lot of songs like "I'm A Man" by Bo Diddley or "Hoochie Coochie Man" by Muddy Waters. But you know, "The Wanderer" is really a sad song. A lot of guys don't understand that. Bruce Springsteen was the only guy who accurately expressed what that song was about. It's "I roam from town to town and go through life without a care, I'm as happy as a clown with my two fists of iron, but I'm going nowhere." In the Fifties, you didn't get that dark. It sounds like a lot of fun but it's about going nowhere.

However, on Maresca's original demo of the song, the lyrics were "with my two fists of iron and my bottle of beer", and the change to "with my two fists of iron but I'm going nowhere" in fact seems to have been at the record company's insistence.

The song has been categorized as rock and roll, rhythm and blues and pop.

Lawsuit
In 2015, the Bethesda Softworks game, Fallout 4, was released, and advertised via a live-action clip of the protagonist and his dog walking through a wasteland, with "The Wanderer" playing in the background. This had been fully licensed by Dion's label. However, Dion filed a lawsuit claiming he was not informed it would be licensed, saying that it "...featured repeated homicides in a dark, dystopian landscape, where violence is glorified as sport. The killings and physical violence were not to protect innocent life, but instead were repugnant and morally indefensible images designed to appeal to young consumers."

Cover versions

"The Wanderer" has been covered by many other popular singers and bands, including Bad Company, Dee Snider, Gary Glitter, The Beach Boys, Leif Garrett (US number 49 in 1978), Bruce Springsteen, Delbert McClinton, Dave Edmunds, Status Quo covered the song twice, once as a complete version, and once again as part of their Anniversary Waltz, Pt. 1. Status Quo's version was a number seven hit in the UK and a number three hit in Ireland in 1984; it was later included on the 2006 reissue of Back to Back. Eddie Rabbitt's version was a number one hit on Billboard's Hot Country Singles & Tracks chart in mid-1988.

Charts

Weekly charts

Dion version

Year-end charts

Status Quo version

Eddie Rabbitt version

See also
Travelin' Man

References

External links
Chords and lyrics
 

1961 songs
1961 singles
1978 singles
Songs written by Ernie Maresca
Dion DiMucci songs
Leif Garrett songs
Eddie Rabbitt songs
The Beach Boys songs
Status Quo (band) songs
Song recordings produced by Richard Landis
RCA Records singles
Laurie Records singles
Atlantic Records singles